The Roman Catholic Church in the Central African Republic consists only of a Latin hierarchy, joint in the national Episcopal Conference of the Central African Republic, comprising a single ecclesiastical province, composed of the Metropolitan Archdiocese and eight suffragan dioceses.

There are no Eastern Catholic, pre-diocesan or other exempt jurisdictions.

There are no titular sees. All defunct jurisdictions have current successor sees;

There is an Apostolic Nunciature to the Central African Republic, as papal diplomatic representation (embassy-level), in national capital Bangui.

Current Latin dioceses

Ecclesiastical Province of Bangui 
 Metropolitan Archdiocese of Bangui
Roman Catholic Diocese of Alindao
Roman Catholic Diocese of Bambari
Roman Catholic Diocese of Bangassou
Roman Catholic Diocese of Berbérati
Roman Catholic Diocese of Bossangoa
Roman Catholic Diocese of Bouar
Roman Catholic Diocese of Kaga-Bandoro
Roman Catholic Diocese of Mbaïki

See also 
 List of Catholic dioceses (structured view)

Sources and external links 
 GCatholic.org - data for all sections.
 Catholic-Hierarchy entry.

Central African Republic
Catholic dioceses